Erik Storck is an American sailor. He competed at the 2012 Summer Olympics in the 49er class.

References

1985 births
Living people
American male sailors (sport)
Olympic sailors of the United States
Sailors at the 2012 Summer Olympics – 49er
People from Huntington, New York